Wittmackia froesii is a species of plant in the family Bromeliaceae. This species is endemic to the State of Bahia in eastern Brazil.

References

froesii
Flora of Brazil
Plants described in 1955